Epitola urania, the purple giant epitola, is a butterfly in the family Lycaenidae. It is found in Sierra Leone, Liberia, Ivory Coast, Ghana, Togo, Nigeria (south and the Cross River loop), Cameroon, Gabon, the Republic of the Congo, the Central African Republic, Angola, the Democratic Republic of the Congo and Uganda.

References

Poritiinae
Butterflies of Africa
Insects of Central Africa
Insects of East Africa
Lepidoptera of West Africa
Butterflies described in 1887
Taxa named by William Forsell Kirby